The Dedication is the fourth mixtape by Lil Wayne, hosted by DJ Drama, released April 2005. It is the first mixtape in the Dedication/Gangsta Grillz series and it was produced and hosted by DJ Drama. The mixtape was given its name because as Wayne explains in the track "Intro", it is dedicated to everyone around the world and to the "fallen soldiers". The cover art shows a shirtless Wayne standing in the road with DJ Drama looking on in the back.

Critical reception 
The mixtape holds a rating of 5 stars (based on over 500 ratings) on DatPiff and has generated over 200,000 downloads. The mixtape has been described as "inspirational" and "a classic" by rap critics, paving the way for a world famous mixtape series.

Track listing 
 All tracks were arranged by DJ Drama.

Young Money: The Mixtape 
In February 2005, prior to the release of The Dedication, Wayne and his group, Young Money released a mixtape, Young Money: The Mixtape. It was a double disc tape and featured every song on The Dedication (besides "Please Say The Baby") without DJ Drama and in their original form. When DJ Drama re-released it as "The Dedication", he added his tags and cut out the other members of Young Money. He also mashed up some of the songs with different instrumentals:

 Motivation (Mashup of Young Money's freestyle over "No Problems" and T.I.'s "Motivation")
 Like Dat (Mashup of Young Money's freestyle over "New York" and Stat Quo's "Like Dat")
 Nah This Ain't The Remix (Mashup of Lil Wayne's freestyle over "Drop it like it's Hot" and Snoop Dogg's "Drop it like it's Hot [Remix]")
 Much More (Mashup of Young Money's freestyle over "Lean Back" and Fat Joe's "Much More")
 D-Boyz (Mashup of Young Money's freestyle over "Smoke, Drank" and Rich Boy's "D-Boyz")
 Stilettoes (Mashup of Young Money's freestyle over "Knuck if you Buck" and Crime Mob's "Stilettos")

References

External links 
 ''" The Dedication Mixtape by Lil Wayne Hosted by DJ Drama at DatPiff

Lil Wayne albums
DJ Drama albums
2005 mixtape albums